Pride in Liverpool (formerly Liverpool Pride), is an annual festival of LGBT culture which takes place across various locations in Liverpool City Centre including the gay quarter. Audience numbers reach up to 75,000 people, making it one of the largest free Gay Pride festivals in Europe. The event is always held on the closest weekend to 2 August, in commemoration of the death of Michael Causer, the young gay man who was murdered in the city in 2008.

Pride in Liverpool usually features a parade and march which sets off on the Saturday at St George's Hall, winding its way through the city centre and ending up at the main site of the festival. The parade attracts over 12,000 participants. Also included is a large open air festival featuring a number of stages, street stalls and street entertainment. More relaxed events usually follow on the Sunday which often include sports, arts and cultural events across the city.
Pride in Liverpool is organised by the LCR Pride Foundation, which champions the rights of LGBT people across the six districts of Halton, Knowsley, City of Liverpool, Sefton, St Helens and Wirral.

The LCR Pride Foundation
Pride in Liverpool is organised by the LCR Pride Foundation, a registered charity governed by memorandum and articles incorporated on 7 January 2019. The stated aims of the charity are to promote equality and diversity by raising awareness of discrimination in society, in particular the difficulties faced by the LGBT community. The foundation also aims to promote LGBT arts and creativity, to maximise the effectiveness of voluntary LGBT organisations and to support charitable events applicable to the LGBT community. The ultimate goal is to make the Liverpool City Region 'the most LGBT+ friendly region in the UK'.

As well as organising the annual Pride in Liverpool festival, the foundation also manages a diverse programme of events, initiatives and campaigns, including Film with Pride, the LCR Pride Awards and a Community Fund which offers grants to the LGBT community.

The foundation has four trustees and a Chief Executive. The current Board of Directors are: Lewis Collins, Mx Em Stewart, Donna Hall and Joseph Donohue. The Chief executive officer is Andi Herring, who is responsible for driving the strategic goals of the charity, managing overall operations and leading on key events and campaigns delivered by the organisation.

The foundation also operates a 'Community Panel', an independent consultation group made up of members of the local LGBT community and allies. The panel meets quarterly and is designed to promote openness and transparency by providing a voice to the community and allowing representation on different issues.

Patrons 
The LCR Pride Foundation has several high profile patrons:
 Angela Eagle
 Paul Bayes
 Pete Price
 Caroline Paige
 Claire Harvey

History

Up until 2010, Liverpool was the largest British city to not hold a Pride and it took many years of campaigning to establish a stable and lasting celebration in the city.  The campaign took a significant turning point in 2008 when the newly formed Liverpool LGBT Network voted that establishing a permanent Pride in the city would be one of its key priorities.  At the height of Liverpool's year as European Capital of Culture, it was felt that staging a successful festival to rival those of other large UK cities was a realistic and attainable goal.  Later in the year, the movement began to gather pace and was bolstered by a renewed sense of urgency and determination following the high-profile homophobic murder of Michael Causer on the outskirts of the city.

A motion in support of Liverpool Pride was put before a full meeting of Liverpool City Council by Labour Councillor Nick Small on 28 January 2009, and was approved by 74 votes to 2.  The City Council stated that the festival would ‘celebrate the city’s diversity, be an opportunity to raise money for charitable causes and boost the city’s visitor and night time economies’.   

The first official Pride was successfully held in the gay quarter in 2010, centered on Dale Street and Stanley Street, however, in 2011 due to a funding shortfall the controversial decision was taken to relocate the main focus of the festival to the city's Pier Head.  Following this announcement, a public backlash ensued and sections of the local LGBT community planned to boycott the event.  In quick response to the anger and disappointment expressed by the community and in an attempt to salvage the situation, more than 30 businesses around Stanley Street (including the Liverpool Gay Village Business Association) rallied together in an unprecedented move and organised a complementary festival to take place in the gay district alongside the main event.

Despite the overall festival proving successful in the end with visitor numbers doubling, organisers came under heavy criticism from openly gay councillor and chair of the Village Business Association, Steve Radford. Radford accused the Pride committee of "running itself aloof from the Gay Quarter and not listening to the needs of the gay community and local businesses."  In an interview with Seen Magazine (a local LGBT publication), Liverpool Pride responded with claims that only a small number of local gay businesses had actually supported the event.

By 2012, lessons had been learned and a much more coherent and unified approach was adopted.  The Pride committee pledged that a presence would be maintained around the gay quarter thanks to a close working partnership with the Village Business Association, the collective that had organised Stanley Street Pride in 2011.  Furthermore, a number of new people elected to Liverpool Pride's Board of Trustees had proven experience as organisers of the Stanley Street Pride the previous year, which meant dialogue between the local gay scene and the main Pride organisers would be much more constructive and free-flowing.

Whilst Liverpool held its first "Official" Pride in 2010, it was not first ever in the city.  Previous Prides have been held in 1979, 1990–1992, and in 1995.

Past festivals

Liverpool Lesbian & Gay Pride in the 1990s

After holding a one-off event in 1979, for many years the lesbian and gay community of Liverpool could not claim a home grown Pride of their own. The community instead opted to march annually in London in commemoration of the 1969 Stonewall uprisings.

However, between 1990-1992, various 'unofficial' community Pride festivals were held in the city thanks to an organised effort between the Liverpool Lesbian & Gay Action group, various arts bodies and local gay clubs.

'Liverpool Lesbian & Gay Pride', as it was known then, was not in any way connected nor indeed related to the contemporary Pride festival. The main differences being that Liverpool Pride is now officially sponsored by public authorities, has a legal structure and framework, is a weekend event as opposed to week-long, and does not include references to 'Lesbian' and 'Gay' in its title through fear of alienating transgender people.  Moreover, Pride in the early 90s tended to concentrate more on arts, exhibitions, culture, talks, workshops and function evenings, in contrast to the party on the scene/popstar on stage format as seen today. The events of the 1990s also had a strong political element and aimed to explore and challenge society's attitudes towards sexuality at that time.  To put it into perspective, gay men still faced an unequal age of consent, the infamous Section 28 was still in existence, there would be no partnership or adoption rights for same sex couples for at least another decade whilst OutRage!, a UK based LGBT activist group, was only in its infancy.  Highlights of the festivals included discussions on women in the church, LGBT parenting and literature, support for gay and lesbian victims of sexual abuse and health awareness workshops.  T-shirts and badges bearing the Pride logos were sold in local gay venues and at events themselves to help cover running costs (see brochure of events below).

The celebration took a brief break, but returned in 1995 under the new name 'Mersey Pride'. A more outdoor cabaret and stage type atmosphere was created around Pownall Square, which was chosen for its close proximity to The Brunswick and Time Out, two popular gay frequented pubs of the day. The occasion was modestly successful as a political statement and was attended by some 1200 revellers from across North West England, albeit attracting noticeable protests from the Christian right.

In many ways, Liverpool Lesbian & Gay Pride of the early 90s paved the way for Homotopia, the city's modern day gay arts festival launched some 12 years later, in the sense that Homotopia took on a similar formula.  The Mersey Pride of 1995, however, bore a stronger resemblance to the present day festivities at Tithebarn Street and Gay Quarter in spite of being significantly smaller and much less mainstream.

Liverpool Gay Pride 1979

The first recorded Liverpool Pride commenced on 22 June 1979 and consisted of a week long celebration in remembrance of the New York Stonewall riots, which took place in the June some ten years earlier.  The Liverpool event can legitimately claim to be one of the earliest known Prides to ever take place in the United Kingdom, the oldest being a march of 700 people through central London in 1972.

References

External links

Pride in Liverpool (Official Site)

Pride parades in England
LGBT culture in Liverpool
Festivals in Liverpool
LGBT organisations in England
Summer events in England